Tajik (Tajik: ,), also called Tajiki Persian (Tajik: ,) or Tajiki, is the variety of Persian spoken in Tajikistan and Uzbekistan by Tajiks. It is closely related to neighbouring Dari of Afghanistan with which it forms a continuum of mutually intelligible varieties of the Persian language. Several scholars consider Tajik as a dialectal variety of Persian rather than a language on its own. The popularity of this conception of Tajik as a variety of Persian was such that, during the period in which Tajik intellectuals were trying to establish Tajik as a language separate from Persian, prominent intellectual Sadriddin Ayni counterargued that Tajik was not a "bastardised dialect" of Persian. The issue of whether Tajik and Persian are to be considered two dialects of a single language or two discrete languages has political sides to it.

By way of Early New Persian, Tajik, like Iranian Persian and Dari Persian, is a continuation of Middle Persian, the official religious and literary language of the Sasanian Empire (224–651 CE), itself a continuation of Old Persian, the language of the Achaemenids (550–330 BC).

Tajik is one of the two official languages of Tajikistan, the other being Russian as the official interethnic language. In Afghanistan (where the Tajik minority forms the principal part of the wider Persophone population), this language is less influenced by Turkic languages, is regarded as a form of Dari, and as such, has co-official language status. The Tajik of Tajikistan has diverged from Persian as spoken in Afghanistan and Iran due to political borders, geographical isolation, the standardisation process and the influence of Russian and neighbouring Turkic languages. The standard language is based on the northwestern dialects of Tajik (region of the old major city of Samarqand), which have been somewhat influenced by the neighbouring Uzbek language as a result of geographical proximity. Tajik also retains numerous archaic elements in its vocabulary, pronunciation, and grammar that have been lost elsewhere in the Persophone world, in part due to its relative isolation in the mountains of Central Asia.

Name
Up to and including the nineteenth century, speakers in Afghanistan and Central Asia had no separate name for the language and simply regarded themselves as speaking Farsi, which is the endonym for the Persian language. The term Tajik, derived from the Persian for "foreigner", was an exonym used by Turkic speakers to refer to Persian speakers (the word Tat has a similar origin), although it has been adopted by the speakers themselves. For the most of the 20th century, its name was rendered in the Russian spelling of Tadzhik.

In 1989, with the growth in Tajik nationalism, a law was enacted declaring Tajik the state (national) language, with Russian being the official language (as throughout the Union). In addition, the law officially equated Tajik with Persian, placing the word Farsi (the endonym for the Persian language) after Tajik. The law also called for a gradual reintroduction of the Perso-Arabic alphabet.

In 1999, the word Farsi was removed from the state language law.

Geographical distribution
The most important cities of Central Asia—Samarkand and Bukhara—are in present-day Uzbekistan, where ethnic Tajiks comprise a majority. Today, virtually all Tajik speakers in Bukhara are bilingual in Tajik and Uzbek. This Tajik–Uzbek bilingualism has had a strong influence on the phonology, morphology, and syntax of Bukharan Tajik. Tajiks are also found in large numbers in the Surxondaryo Region in the south and along Uzbekistan's eastern border with Tajikistan. Tajik is still widely spoken in Samarkand and Bukhara today. Writing in 1996, Richard Foltz estimated that Tajiks might account for perhaps 70% of the total population of Samarqand and as much as 90% of Bukhara. Later demographical trends are not clear.

Official statistics in Uzbekistan state that the Tajik community comprises 5% of the nation's total population. However, these numbers do not include ethnic Tajiks who, for a variety of reasons, choose to identify themselves as Uzbeks in population census forms. During the Soviet "Uzbekisation" supervised by Sharof Rashidov, the head of the Uzbek Communist Party, Tajiks had to choose either to stay in Uzbekistan and get registered as Uzbek in their passports or leave the republic for the less-developed agricultural and mountainous Tajikistan. The "Uzbekisation" movement ended in 1924. In 1996, Richard Foltz estimated that Tajiks might make up 25%-35% of Uzbekistan's population. Later demographical trends are not clear.

Tajiks constitute 80% of Tajikistan's population and the language dominates in most parts of the country. Some Tajiks in Gorno-Badakhshan in southeastern Tajikistan, where the Pamir languages are the native languages of most residents, are bilingual. Tajiks are the dominant ethnic group in Northern Afghanistan as well and are also the majority group in scattered pockets elsewhere in the country, particularly urban areas such as Kabul, Mazar-i-Sharif, Kunduz, Ghazni, and Herat. Tajiks constitute between 25% and 35% of the total population of the country. In Afghanistan, the dialects spoken by ethnic Tajiks are written using the Persian alphabet and referred to as Dari, along with the dialects of other groups in Afghanistan such as the Hazaragi and Aimaq dialects. Approximately 48%-58% of Afghan citizens are native speakers of Dari. A large Tajik-speaking diaspora exists due to the instability that has plagued Central Asia in recent years, with significant numbers of Tajiks found in Russia, Kazakhstan, and beyond. This Tajik diaspora is also the result of the poor state of the economy of Tajikistan and each year approximately one million men leave Tajikistan to gain employment in Russia.

Dialects
Tajik dialects can be approximately split into the following groups:

 Northern dialects (Northern Tajikistan, Bukhara, Samarkand, Kyrgyzstan, and the Varzob valley region of Dushanbe).
 Central dialects (dialects of the upper Zarafshan Valley)
 Southern dialects (South and East of Dushanbe, Kulob, and the Rasht region of Tajikistan)
 Southeastern dialects (dialects of the Darvoz region and the Amu Darya near Rushon)
The dialect used by the Bukharan Jews of Central Asia is known as the Bukhori dialect and belongs to the northern dialect grouping. It is chiefly distinguished by the inclusion of Hebrew terms, principally religious vocabulary, and historical use of the Hebrew alphabet. Despite these differences, Bukhori is readily intelligible to other Tajik speakers, particularly speakers of northern dialects.

A very important moment in the development of the contemporary Tajik, especially of the spoken language, is the tendency in changing its dialectal orientation. The dialects of Northern Tajikistan were the foundation of the prevalent standard Tajik, while the Southern dialects did not enjoy either popularity or prestige. Now all politicians and public officials make their speeches in the Kulob dialect, which is also used in broadcasting.

Phonology

Vowels
The table below lists the six vowel phonemes in standard, literary Tajik. Letters from the Tajik Cyrillic alphabet are given first, followed by IPA transcription. Local dialects frequently have more than the six seen below.

In central and southern dialects, classical  has chain shifted upward and merged into .

It is analogous to standard Persian â (long a).

The vowel ⟨Ӣ ӣ⟩ usually represents a stressed /i/ at the end of a word. However not all instances of ⟨Ӣ ӣ⟩ are stressed because the second person singular suffix -ӣ is unstressed. 

The vowels /i/, /u/ and /a/ are reduced to [ə] in unstressed syllables.

Consonants
The Tajik language contains 24 consonants, 16 of which form contrastive pairs by voicing: [б/п] [в/ф] [д/т] [з/с] [ж/ш] [ҷ/ч] [г/к] [ғ/х]. The table below lists the consonant phonemes in standard, literary Tajik. Letters from the Tajik Cyrillic alphabet are given first, followed by IPA transcription.

Word stress
Word stress generally falls on the first syllable in finite verb forms and on the last syllable in nouns and noun-like words. Examples of where stress does not fall on the last syllable are adverbs like: бале (bale, meaning "yes") and зеро (zero, meaning "because"). Stress also does not fall on enclitics, nor on the marker of the direct object.

Grammar

The word order of Tajiki Persian is subject–object–verb. Tajik Persian grammar is similar to the classical Persian grammar (and the grammar of modern varieties such as Iranian Persian). The most notable difference between classical Persian grammar and Tajik Persian grammar is the construction of the present progressive tense in each language. In Tajik, the present progressive form consists of a present progressive participle, from the verb истодан, istodan, 'to stand' and a cliticised form of the verb -acт, -ast, 'to be'.

In Iranian Persian, the present progressive form consists of the verb دار, dār, 'to have' followed by a conjugated verb in either the simple present tense, the habitual past tense or the habitual past perfect tense.

Nouns
Nouns are not marked for grammatical gender, although they are marked for number.

Two forms of number exist in Tajik, singular and plural. The plural is marked by either the suffix -ҳо, -ho or -он, -on (with contextual variants -ён, -yon and -гон, -gon), although Arabic loan words may use Arabic forms. There is no definite article, but the indefinite article exists in the form of the number "one" як, yak and -е, -e, the first positioned before the noun and the second joining the noun as a suffix. When a noun is used as a direct object, it is marked by the suffix -ро, -ro, e.g. Рустамро задам (Rustam-ro zadam), "I hit Rustam". This direct object suffix is added to the word after any plural suffixes. The form -ро can be literary or formal. In older forms of the Persian language, -ро could indicate both direct and indirect objects and some phrases used in modern Persian and Tajik have maintained this suffix on indirect objects, as seen in the following example: (Худоро шукр, Xudo-ro šukr - "Thank God"). Modern Persian does not use the direct object marker as a suffix on the noun, but rather, as a stand-alone morpheme.

Prepositions

Vocabulary
Tajik is conservative in its vocabulary, retaining numerous terms that have long since fallen into disuse in Iran and Afghanistan, such as арзиз (arziz), meaning "tin" and фарбеҳ (farbeh), meaning "fat". Most modern loan words in Tajik come from Russian as a result of the position of Tajikistan within the Soviet Union. The vast majority of these Russian loanwords which have entered the Tajik language through the fields of socioeconomics, technology and government, where most of the concepts and vocabulary of these fields have been borrowed from the Russian language. The introduction of Russian loanwords into the Tajik language was largely justified under the Soviet policy of modernisation and the necessary subordination of all languages to Russian for the achievement of a Communist state. Vocabulary also comes from the geographically close Uzbek language and, as is usual in Islamic countries, from Arabic. Since the late 1980s, an effort has been made to replace loanwords with native equivalents, using either old terms that had fallen out of use or coined terminology (including from Iranian Persian). Many of the coined terms for modern items such as гармкунак (garmkunak), meaning 'heater' and чангкашак (čangkašak), meaning 'vacuum cleaner' differ from their Afghan and Iranian equivalents, adding to the difficulty in intelligibility between Tajik and other forms of Persian.

In the table below, Persian refers to the standard language of Iran, which differs somewhat from the Dari Persian of Afghanistan. Two other Iranian languages, Pashto and Kurdish (Kurmanji), have also been included for comparative purposes.

Writing system

In Tajikistan and other countries of the former Soviet Union, Tajik Persian is currently written in Cyrillic script, although it was written in the Latin script beginning in 1928 and the Arabic alphabet prior to 1928. In the Tajik Soviet Socialist Republic, the use of the Latin script was later replaced in 1939 by the Cyrillic script. The Tajik alphabet added six additional letters to the Cyrillic script inventory and these additional letters are distinguished in the Tajik orthography by the use of diacritics.

History
According to many scholars, the New Persian language (which subsequently evolved into the Persian forms spoken in Iran, Afghanistan and Tajikistan) developed in Transoxiana and Khorasan, in what are today parts of Afghanistan, Iran, Uzbekistan and Tajikistan. While the New Persian language was descended primarily from Middle Persian, it also incorporated substantial elements of other Iranian languages of ancient Central Asia, such as Sogdian.

Following the Arab conquest of Iran and most of Central Asia in the 8th century AD, Arabic for a time became the court language and Persian and other Iranian languages were relegated to the private sphere. In the 9th century AD, following the rise of the Samanids, whose state was centered around the cities of Bukhoro (Buxoro), Samarqand and Herat and covered much of Uzbekistan, Tajikistan, Afghanistan and northeastern Iran, New Persian emerged as the court language and swiftly displaced Arabic. Arabic influence continued to show itself in the form of the Perso-Arabic script used to write the language (replaced in Tajik by Latin and then Cyrillic in the 20th century) and a large number of Arabic loanwords.

New Persian became the lingua franca of Central Asia for centuries, although it eventually lost ground to the Chaghatai language in much of its former domains as a growing number of Turkic tribes moved into the region from the east. Since the 16th century AD, Tajik has come under increasing pressure from neighbouring Turkic languages. Once spoken in areas of Turkmenistan, such as Merv, Tajik is today virtually non-existent in that country. Uzbek has also largely replaced Tajik in most areas of modern Uzbekistan – the Russian Empire in particular implemented Turkification among Tajiks in Ferghana and Samarqand, replacing the dominant language in those areas with Uzbek. Nevertheless, Tajik persisted in pockets, notably in Samarqand, Bukhoro and Surxondaryo Region, as well as in much of what is today Tajikistan.

The creation of the Tajik Soviet Socialist Republic within the Soviet Union in 1929 helped to safeguard the future of Tajik, as it became an official language of the republic alongside Russian. Still, substantial numbers of Tajik-speakers remained outside the borders of the republic, mostly in the neighbouring Uzbek Soviet Socialist Republic, which created a source of tension between Tajiks and Uzbeks. Neither Samarqand nor Bukhoro was included in the nascent Tajik S.S.R., despite their immense historical importance in Tajik history. After the creation of the Tajik SSR, a large number of ethnic Tajiks from the Uzbek SSR migrated there, particularly to the region of the capital, Dushanbe, exercising a substantial influence in the republic's political, cultural and economic life. The influence of this influx of ethnic Tajik immigrants from the Uzbek SSR is most prominently manifested in the fact that literary Tajik is based on their northwestern dialects of the language, rather than the central dialects that are spoken by the natives in the Dushanbe region and adjacent areas.

After the fall of the Soviet Union and Tajikistan's independence in 1991, the government of Tajikistan has made substantial efforts to promote the use of Tajik in all spheres of public and private life. Tajik is gaining ground among the once-Russified upper classes and continues its role as the vernacular of the majority of the country's population. There has been a rise in the number of Tajik publications. Increasing contact with media from Iran and Afghanistan, after decades of isolation under the Soviets, is also having an effect on the development of the language.

See also

 Academy of Persian Language and Literature
 Bukhori dialect
 Iranian peoples
 Iranian studies
 List of Persian poets and authors
 List of Tajik musicians
 Tajik alphabet

Notes

References

 Azim Baizoyev, John Hayward: A beginner's guide to Tajiki. - 1. publ. - London [u. a.]: RoutledgeCurzon, 2004. (includes a Tajiki-English Dictionary)
 Ido, S. (2005) Tajik 
 Korotow, M. (2004) Tadschikisch Wort für Wort. Kauderwelsch 
 Lazard, G. (1956) "Caractères distinctifs de la langue tadjik". Bulletin de la Société Linguistique de Paris. 52. pp. 117–186
 Lazard, G. "Le Persan". Compendium Linguarum Iranicarum. Wiesbaden. 1989.
 Windfuhr, G. (1987) in Comrie, B. (ed.) "Persian". The World's Major Languages. pp. 523–546
 Perry, J. R. (2005) A Tajik Persian Reference Grammar (Boston : Brill) 
 Rastorgueva, V. (1963) A Short Sketch of Tajik Grammar (Netherlands : Mouton) 
 Назарзода, С. – Сангинов, А. – Каримов, С. – Султон, М. Ҳ. (2008) Фарҳанги тафсирии забони тоҷикӣ (иборат аз ду ҷилд). Ҷилди I. А – Н. Ҷилди II. О – Я. (Душанбе).
 Khojayori, Nasrullo, and Mikael Thompson. Tajiki Reference Grammar for Beginners. Washington, DC: Georgetown UP, 2009. 
 Windfuhr, Gernot. "Persian and Tajik." The Iranian Languages. New York, NY: Routledge, 2009. 
 Windfuhr, Gernot. Persian Grammar: History and State of Its Study. De Gruyter, 1979. Trends in Linguistics. State-Of-The-Art Reports. 
 Marashi, Mehdi, and Mohammad Ali Jazayery. Persian Studies in North America: Studies in Honor of Mohammad Ali Jazayery. Bethesda, MD: Iran, 1994.

Further reading

 
 John Perry. TAJIK ii. TAJIK PERSIAN (Encyclopædia Iranica)
 Bahriddin Aliev and Aya Okawa. TAJIK iii. COLLOQUIAL TAJIKI IN COMPARISON WITH PERSIAN OF IRAN (Encyclopædia Iranica)

External links

 Tajiki Cyrillic to Persian alphabet converter
 A Worldwide Community for Tajiks
 Tajik Swadesh list of basic vocabulary words (from Wiktionary's Swadesh-list appendix)
 BBC news in Tajik
 English-Tajik-Russian Dictionary
 Free Online Tajik Dictionary
 Welcome to Tajikistan
  Численность населения Республики Таджикистан на 1 января 2015 года. Сообщение Агентства по статистике при Президенте Республики Таджикистан
 намоишгоҳи "Китоби Душанбе". A news clip about a Dushanbe book exhibition, with examples of various members of the public speaking Tajiki.

 
Languages of Afghanistan
Languages of Kazakhstan
Languages of Kyrgyzstan
Languages of Russia
Languages of China
Languages of Tajikistan
Languages of Turkmenistan
Languages of Uzbekistan
Persian dialects and varieties
Subject–object–verb languages